AM-1714 (part of the AM cannabinoid series) is a drug that acts as a reasonably selective agonist of the peripheral cannabinoid receptor CB2, with sub-nanomolar affinity and 490x selectivity over the related CB1 receptor. In animal studies it has both analgesic and anti-allodynia effects. The 9-methoxy derivative AM-1710 has similar CB2 affinity but only 54x selectivity over CB1.

See also 
 Cannabinol
 Canbisol

References 

AM cannabinoids
Benzochromenes
Coumarins